Jatuporn Pramualban is a Thai former football coach.

Honours
Player
Clubs
Thai Farmers Bank
 AFC Champions League  Champions; 1994, 1995
 Thai League T1  Champions; 1991, 1992, 1993, 1995
 Queen's Cup  Champions; 1994, 1995
 Afro-Asian Club Championship  Champions; 1994

Manager
International
Thailand (Women's)
 2013 Southeast Asian Games  Gold Medals
Thailand (Men U19)
 Jockey Club International Youth Tournament  Champions; 2017

References
 

Jatuporn Pramualban
Living people
National team coaches
1970 births
Jatuporn Pramualban
Association football defenders
Jatuporn Pramualban